The Apostolic Nunciature to Sudan is an ecclesiastical office of the Catholic Church in Sudan. It is a diplomatic post of the Holy See, whose representative is called the Apostolic Nuncio with the rank of an ambassador.

The Apostolic Nunciature to Sudan was established in 1972. It had previously been overseen by a variety of delegations with regional authority, the last of which were the Delegation to Eastern Africa erected in 1960 and the Delegation to the Red Sea Region.

Since 31 March 2020, the position of Apostolic Nuncio to both Sudan and Eritrea has been held by Monsignor Luis Miguel Munoz Cardaba of Spain.

List of papal representatives
Apostolic Delegates to the Red Sea Region 
Ubaldo Calabresi (3 July 1969 - 5 January 1978)
Nunciature to Sudan established 29 April 1972.
Apostolic Pro-Nuncio
Giovanni Moretti (13 March 1978 - 10 July 1984)
Luis Robles Díaz (16 February 1985 - 13 March 1990)
Apostolic Nuncios 
Erwin Josef Ender (15 March 1990 - 9 July 1997)
Marco Dino Brogi (13 December 1997 - 5 February 2002)
Dominique Mamberti (18 May 2002 - 15 September 2006)
Leo Boccardi (16 January 2007 - 11 July 2013)
Hubertus van Megen (8 March 2014 - 16 February 2019)
Luís Miguel Muñoz Cárdaba (31 March 2020 – present)

References

 
Holy See
Sudan
Vatican City